Ryan Ince (born 16 September 1996) is an English professional rugby league footballer who plays on the  for Widnes Vikings in the RFL Championship. 

He played for the Widnes Vikings in the Super League and in the Betfred Championship. He has also spent time on loan from Widnes at Whitehaven in the  Championship and Hunslet and the North Wales Crusaders in League 1. Ince has also spent time on loan from the Leigh Centurions at Oldham (Heritage № 1424) in the RFL Championship.

Background
Ryan Ince was born in Widnes, Cheshire, England.

Playing career

Widnes Vikings
He graduated from the Widnes Vikings Academy system and played his junior rugby league for the Widnes Moorfield club. He has represented England at youth team level.

He made his début for Whitehaven, whilst on loan at the club in the Kingstone Press Championship in 2016. 
In 2016, he made his Widnes Vikings début against Hull FC.

Leigh Centurions
On 24 February 2020, it was announced that Ince had signed for Oldham on loan.

Oldham RLFC
On 19 November 2020, it was announced that Ince would join Oldham for the 2021 season on a one-year deal.

Widnes Vikings (re-join)
On 27 September 2021, it was reported that he had signed for Widnes in the RFL Championship.

References

External links
Widnes Vikings profile
SL profile

1996 births
Living people
Hunslet R.L.F.C. players
Leigh Leopards players
North Wales Crusaders players
Oldham R.L.F.C. players
Rugby league players from Widnes
Rugby league wingers
Widnes Vikings players
Whitehaven R.L.F.C. players